Lasalle is a commune in the Gard department in southern France. The historian and epigrapher William Seston (1900–1980) was born in Lassale.

Population

See also
Communes of the Gard department

References

Communes of Gard